Jasvir Singh  (Punjabi: ਜਸਵੀਰ ਸਿੰਘ) is a British family law barrister, media commentator and social activist. He is a co-founder of South Asian Heritage Month. Singh regularly appears in the British media to speak about the British Sikh experience and also interfaith related matters.

Career 

Born in London, Singh has worked as a family law barrister since 2006. He made the decision to join the legal profession after he saw an aunt to whom he was close go through a traumatic divorce when he was eight.

He is the chairperson for the Faiths Forum for London, an interfaith organisation based in London representing the interests of the nine major faith traditions. He is chairperson for City Sikhs, a charity which represents the interests of progressive Sikhs. In 2016 he also became an associate of St Paul's Institute.

He is the main Sikh contributor to the Thought for the Day segment on BBC Radio 4's Today programme. 

Singh is a Labour Party activist and following the successful election of Sadiq Khan to the position of Mayor of London in May 2016, he was selected to join the shortlist of Labour candidates for the Tooting by-election.

In 2017, Singh was instrumental in launching the Grand Trunk Project in partnership with DCLG to mark the 70-year anniversary of the independence of India, creation of Pakistan, and the partition of Punjab and Bengal with the aim of bringing the diverse communities of South Asia together. The project was named after the Grand Trunk Road which has connected Bangladesh, India and Pakistan for over 2,000 years.

Singh is the founder of South Asian Heritage Month in the UK, an awareness month which aims to celebrate British South Asian culture and identity.

In February 2021, he was appointed to the Mayor of London's Commission for Diversity in the Public Realm.

Honours, awards and recognition 
Singh was appointed Officer of the Order of the British Empire (OBE) in the 2017 New Year Honours for services to promoting community cohesion and Commander of the Order of the British Empire (CBE) in the 2023 New Year Honours for services to charity, faith communities and social cohesion.

In 2018, he was made an honorary fellow of the Edward Cadbury Centre for the Public Understanding of Religion based at the University of Birmingham in recognition of his Interfaith work.

Personal life 
Singh is a Sikh and is openly gay.

See also 
 List of British Sikhs

References

External links 
 Jasvir Singh

Living people
Radio presenters from London
People educated at King's College School, London
Lawyers from London
Year of birth missing (living people)
Commanders of the Order of the British Empire
English Sikhs
English barristers
English people of Punjabi descent